Thawing Dawn is the first solo studio album by Andrew Savage under the stage name A. Savage, the co-frontman of the New York City-based rock band Parquet Courts. The album was released on October 13, 2017 on the Dull Tools label.

Track listing
"Buffalo Calf Road" – 3:30
"Eyeballs" – 2:54
"Wild, Wild, Wild Horses" – 4:36
"Indian Style" – 4:11
"What Do I Do" – 7:52
"Phantom Limbo" – 3:53
"Winter in the South" – 3:21
"Ladies from Houston" – 7:03
"Untitled" – 3:27
"Thawing Dawn" – 5:05

References

2017 debut albums